Aapko Pehle Bhi Kahin Dekha Hai is a 2003 Indian Bollywood film directed by Anubhav Sinha and produced by Bhushan Kumar. It stars Priyanshu Chatterjee and Sakshi Shivanand in pivotal roles.

Plot
The film is a story of a father Sam, a successful Indian businessman and a protective father who cannot accept the fact that his daughter Paakhi  will get married and go away like other daughters too. He believes that no other man can love her as much as he does. But the inevitable happens?

Paakhi falls in love with Samar, a suspended cop who ends up in Calgary searching for a criminal but Sam doesn't approve of him initially and takes a while to accept his future son-in-law. He eventually gives in to his daughter's wish and gets her married to the man she loves.

Cast
 Priyanshu Chatterjee as ACP Samar Dev
 Sakshi Shivanand as Pakhi Shyam/Pakhi Samar Dev
 Om Puri as Shyam 'Sam'
 Farida Jalal as Asha 'Jiji'
 Pummy Brar as Rahim
 Navneet Nishan as Jinni
 Veerendra Saxena as Mohandas
 Manoj Pahwa as Aziz Khan
 Monami as Jinni's assistant
 Arundhati Ganorkar as Saira, Aziz's wife

Soundtrack
The album features 12 original songs composed by duo Nikhil-Vinay. All lyrics written by Sameer. The album received positive review especially for "Barsaat", "Aapki Yaad Aaye To", "Aapko Pehli Bhi Kahin Dekha Hai" and "Kabhie Khan Khan". Harshdeep Kaur made her debut in Bollywood film industry as Hindi playback singer in "Sajna Main Haari".

Reception
Taran Adarsh of IndiaFM gave the film 2 stars out of 5, writing ″On the whole, AAPKO PEHLE BHI KAHIN DEKHA HAI has a universally acceptable theme (a father's love for his daughter) that has been handled with sincerity. Despite a not-too-convincing screenplay, the film has its share of plusses in the form of competent performances, able direction, rich emotions, rib-tickling comedy and soulful music, besides the breath-taking locales of Canada. At the box-office, the film may find flavour with families. The fantastic promotion by its producers (Super Cassettes Industries Ltd.) will only add to its prospects.″ Ronjita Kulkarni of Rediff.com wrote ″All the characters, except Om Puri, are half-baked. The film has been shot entirely in Canada, and it must be said that the foreign actors are absolutely atrocious. Nikhil-Vinay's music is poor, except for Jagjit Singh and Asha Bhosle's exceptional ghazal Aisi aakhen nahin dekhi. The Hindi film industry has to wait yet another Friday for that elusive hit this year.

References

External links
 

2000s Hindi-language films
2003 films
Films scored by Nikhil-Vinay
Films directed by Anubhav Sinha
Films set in Calgary
T-Series (company) films